First Lake may refer to:

First Lake (New York), part of the Fulton Chain of Lakes
First Lake (Bisby Lakes, New York)
First Lake (Nova Scotia)
First Lake (Richmond County, Nova Scotia)
First Lake, first of four lakes in the Nanaimo Lakes chain